This is a list of seasons completed by the Los Angeles Avengers. The Avengers were a professional arena football franchise of the Arena Football League (AFL), based in Los Angeles, California. The team was established in 2000. The Avengers made the playoffs five times in their existence, including four consecutive playoff berths from 2002–2005 and one division championship in the 2005 season. The Avengers have never been to an ArenaBowl, and in fact have only won one playoff game in franchise history. Before the AFL announced it would suspend operations indefinitely, and canceling the 2009 season, the Avengers folded. The team played its home games at the Staples Center.

References
General
 

Arena Football League seasons by team
Los Angeles Avengers seasons
Los Angeles sports-related lists